In probability theory and statistics, the Poisson binomial distribution  is the discrete probability distribution of a sum of independent Bernoulli trials that are not necessarily identically distributed.  The concept is named after Siméon Denis Poisson.

In other words, it is the probability distribution of the
number of successes in a collection of n independent yes/no experiments with success probabilities .

Definitions

Probability Mass Function

The probability of having k successful trials out of a total of n can be written as the sum

where  is the set of all subsets of k integers that can be selected from {1,2,3,...,n}.

 will contain  elements, the sum over which is infeasible to compute in practice unless the number of trials n is small (e.g. if n = 30,  contains over 1020 elements). However, there are other, more efficient ways to calculate .

As long as none of the success probabilities are equal to one, one can calculate the probability of k successes using the recursive formula 

where

 

The recursive formula is not numerically stable, and should be avoided if  is greater than approximately 20.

Another possibility is using the discrete Fourier transform.

Still other methods are described in "Statistical Applications of the Poisson-Binomial and conditional Bernoulli distributions" by Chen and Liu.

Properties

Mean and Variance

Since a Poisson binomial distributed variable is a sum of n independent Bernoulli distributed variables, its mean and variance will simply be sums of the mean and variance of the n Bernoulli distributions:

 

 

For fixed values of the mean and size (n), the variance is maximal when all success probabilities are equal and we have a binomial distribution. When the mean is fixed, the variance is bounded from above by the variance of the Poisson distribution with the same mean which is attained asymptotically  as n tends to infinity.

Entropy
There is no simple formula for the entropy of a Poisson binomial distribution, but the entropy is bounded above by the entropy of a binomial distribution with the same number parameter and the same mean. Therefore, the entropy is also bounded above by the entropy of a Poisson distribution with the same mean.

The Shepp–Olkin concavity conjecture, due to Lawrence Shepp and Ingram Olkin in 1981, states that the entropy of a Poisson binomial distribution is a concave function of the success probabilities . This conjecture was proved by Erwan Hillion and Oliver Johnson in 2015. This conjecture was also proved by Hillion and Johnson, in 2019

Chernoff bound

The probability that a Poisson binomial distribution gets large, can be bounded using its moment generating function as follows (valid when  and for any ):

 

where we took . This is similar to the tail bounds of a binomial distribution.

Computational methods 

The reference  discusses techniques of evaluating the probability mass function of the Poisson binomial distribution. The following software implementations are based on it:
 An R package poibin was provided along with the paper, which is available for the computing of the cdf, pmf, quantile function, and random number generation of the Poisson binomial distribution. For computing the PMF, a DFT algorithm or a recursive algorithm can be specified to compute the exact PMF, and approximation methods using the normal and Poisson distribution can also be specified.
 poibin - Python implementation - can compute the PMF and CDF, uses the DFT method described in the paper for doing so.

See also

Le Cam's theorem

References

Discrete distributions
Factorial and binomial topics